Joseph Kibor (born 22 December 1972) is a Kenyan runner.

At the 1997 World Cross Country Championships he finished seventh in the long race, earning a place on the Kenyan team that won the team competition.

Achievements

References

External links

1972 births
Living people
Kenyan male long-distance runners
Athletes (track and field) at the 1990 Commonwealth Games
Kenyan male cross country runners
Commonwealth Games competitors for Kenya
20th-century Kenyan people
21st-century Kenyan people